Cercophonius michaelseni is a species of scorpion in the Bothriuridae family. It occurs in Western Australia, and was first described in 1908 by German naturalist Karl Kraepelin. The specific epithet michaelseni honours German zoologist Wilhelm Michaelsen.

References

michaelseni
Scorpions of Australia
Fauna of Western Australia
Animals described in 1908
Taxa named by Karl Kraepelin
Endemic fauna of Australia